Patryk Walczak (born 29 July 1992) is a Polish handball player who plays for Sporting CP and the Polish national handball team.

He participated at the 2017 World Men's Handball Championship.

Honors
 Macedonian Handball Super League
 Winner: 2021, 2022
 Macedonian Handball Cup
 Winner:2021, 2022

References

1992 births
Living people
Polish male handball players
Vive Kielce players
Sportspeople from Szczecin